Europium(III) bromide (or europium tribromide) is a crystalline compound, a salt, made of one europium and three bromine atoms. Europium tribromide is a grey powder at room temperature. It is odorless. Europium tribromide is hygroscopic.

Reactions
When vaporized, europium(III) bromide reacts by the equation:
2 EuBr3 → 2 Eu + 3 Br2

Europium(III) bromide is also created through the equations:
4 EuBr2+ 4 HBr → 4 EuBr3 + 2 H2

References

Bromides
Europium(III) compounds